Myroslav Pavlovych Reshko (born 18 August 1970, in Mukachevo) is a Ukrainian football player who played for BVSC Budapest.

External links
Statistics at FFU website

1970 births
Living people
People from Mukachevo
Ukrainian footballers
Ukrainian expatriate footballers
Expatriate footballers in Hungary
Association football defenders
Stadler FC footballers
Budapesti VSC footballers
Sportspeople from Zakarpattia Oblast